Eupithecia platymesa is a moth in the family Geometridae. It is found in Mexico.

References

Moths described in 1918
platymesa
Moths of Central America